Alpár is both a Hungarian surname and a masculine Hungarian given name. Notable people with the name include:

Surname:
Gitta Alpár (1903–1991), Hungarian-born opera and operetta soprano
Ignác Alpár, (1855–1928), Hungarian architect

Given name:
Alpár Jegenyés (born 1958), Hungarian handball player
Alpar Meszaros, Romanian footballer

See also
Alpar (disambiguation)
Tiszaalpár

Hungarian masculine given names
Hungarian-language surnames